Surendranath Evening College, established in 1961, is an undergraduate college in Sealdah, Kolkata, West Bengal, India. It is affiliated with the University of Calcutta.

Departments

Science

Physics
Chemistry
Mathematics
Electronic Science

Arts and Commerce

Bengali
English
Sanskrit
Hindi
Urdu
History
Geography
Political Science
Philosophy
Economics
Education
Commerce

Accreditation
Surendranath Evening College is recognized by the University Grants Commission (UGC).

See also 
Surendranath Law College
Surendranath College for Women
Surendranath College
List of colleges affiliated to the University of Calcutta
Education in India
Education in West Bengal

References

External links
Surendranath Evening College

University of Calcutta affiliates
Educational institutions established in 1961
1961 establishments in West Bengal
Evening